Neha Sharma (born 9 June 1988) is an Indian-born cricketer who plays for the United Arab Emirates national cricket team. 
In July 2018, she was named in the United Arab Emirates' squad for the 2018 ICC Women's World Twenty20 Qualifier tournament. She made her Women's Twenty20 International (WT20I) debut for the United Arab Emirates against Bangladesh in the World Twenty20 Qualifier on 10 July 2018.

References

External links
 

1988 births
Living people
Emirati women cricketers
United Arab Emirates women Twenty20 International cricketers
Cricketers from Delhi
Sportswomen from Delhi
Indian emigrants to the United Arab Emirates
Indian expatriate sportspeople in the United Arab Emirates